Sov på min arm is an album by the Swedish singer Carola Häggkvist. It was released in November 2001 in Sweden, Norway, Denmark and Finland.

Track listing
Byssan lull
Det gåtfulla folket B
Brahm's vaggvisa (Nu i ro slumra in)
Thula Sana
Jag vill alltid älska
Videvisan
Sov på min arm (Nocturne by Evert Taube)
Vi har en tulta med ögon blå
Majas visa
Ge mig handen, min vän
Jag lyfter ögat
Att komma hem (Som när ett barn)
Tänk att få vakna
Lyckeliten
Käre Gud, jag har det gott
Lasse litens medley
Jag sjunger godnatt
Gud som haver barnen kär
Du omsluter mig

Release history

Charts

References

2001 albums
Carola Häggkvist albums